Alfred Konrad Gansiniec (29 October 1919 – 20 March 1999) was a Polish ice hockey player. He played for OMP Giszowiec, Polonia Janów, Siła Giszowiec, Górnik Janów, Górnik Katowice, and Fortuna Wyry during his career. He also played for the Polish national team at the 1948 and 1952 Winter Olympics, and the 1955 World Championship. Gansiniec was awarded the Order of the Banner of Work for his efforts.

References

External links
 

1919 births
1999 deaths
Ice hockey players at the 1948 Winter Olympics
Ice hockey players at the 1952 Winter Olympics
Olympic ice hockey players of Poland
Polish ice hockey forwards
Recipients of the Order of the Banner of Work
Sportspeople from Katowice